Kabab torsh is a traditional kebab from Gilan and Mazandaran provinces in Iran. It is made with beef, usually sirloin or tenderloin, in recent years it has been made with chicken too. Red or white meat is marinated in a paste made of crushed walnuts, pomegranate juice, chopped parsley, olive oil, and crushed garlic. 

It is then cooked on skewers over charcoal. Traditionally, it is eaten with kateh (boiled rice) and a vast variety of Gilani side dishes.
The most important point for preparing this kebab is to use a type of local vegetable called Chochaagh.
This plant grows only in northern Iran and gives a special taste to Kabab torsh. Chochaagh vegetable is not specifically known in other parts of the world and belongs to the northern regions of Iran.

See also
Iranian cuisine
 List of kebabs

External links
 Kabab torsh Recipe (in Persian)
 Kabab Torsh Recipe

References

Iranian cuisine
Middle Eastern grilled meats
Skewered kebabs
Gilan Province
Mazandaran Province